Holy Money is the fourth studio album by American experimental rock band Swans. It was released in March 1986, through record label K.422. The album was recorded in the same sessions as "Time Is Money (Bastard)", "A Screw", and Greed.

Background 
The first CD issue contained the A Screw EP as bonus tracks. A later compilation released in 1992, Greed / Holy Money, combined Holy Money (barring "A Screw (Holy Money)", though "A Screw (Holy Money) (Mix)" was listed as this) and Greed (barring "Fool" and "Money Is Flesh", however "Fool (#2)" and "Money Is Flesh (#2)" were listed as these, respectively), as well as the entirety of the A Screw EP and an abridged version of "Time Is Money (Bastard) (Mix)" (listed as "Time Is Money (Bastard)") from the Time Is Money (Bastard) EP. This compilation, with its entirely re-organized track list, saw re-issue in 1999 in the double-disc set Cop/Young God / Greed/Holy Money, which included the Cop album and Young God EP.

Critical reception 

AllMusic commented that Holy Money "well documents the continuing transformation of Swans into a more complex, intriguing beast." Trouser Press called it "more or less a twin to Greed; virtually identical in cover art and musical approach". Aaron Lariviere of Stereogum described Holy Money as a "transitional album", but called it "brilliant in [its] own right". Maynard James Keenan of Tool named the album as a major influence.

Track listing

Personnel 
Credits adapted from Holy Money liner notes

Performers
 Michael Gira – vocals, piano, sampling, production
 Norman Westberg – guitar
 Jarboe – vocals (tracks 1 and 2)
 Algis Kizys – bass (tracks 1 and 4)
 Harry Crosby – bass (tracks 3, 5, and 6)
 Ronald Gonzales – drums (track 1, 5, 6, and 7)
 Ted Parsons – drums (tracks 1 and 4)
 Ivan Nahem – drums (track 3)

Additional personnel
 Roli Mosimann – mixing (track 4)
 Jorgé Estabon – engineering, production
 Paul White – artwork

Charts

References 

Swans (band) albums
1986 albums
Albums produced by Michael Gira